Bilal El Mehdi Wahib (born in Amsterdam, 20 January 1999) is a Dutch actor, singer and rapper. He has appeared in diverse Dutch films and series like Nieuwe buren, SpangaS, Mocro Maffia and Commando's  and films Layla M., De Held, De libi and Paradise Drifters portrayed mainly in ethnic roles. In 2020, he won the Golden Calf for Best Supporting Actor for his role in Paradise Drifters in the role of Yousef.

Besides frequent appearances on screen, he also developed a music career with a number of singles starting 2019. His debut charting single was from the soundtrack of the film he had a role in, De libi, resulting in the single "Vliegen". His 2020 hit "Tigers" and his 2021 hit "501" both topped the Dutch Single Top 100 chart and peaked at number 3 on the Dutch Top 40 charts. He was nominated to top 5 of the MTV Europe Music Award for Best Dutch Act for 2020 but did not win.

In March 2021, Wahib came under scrutiny after appearing in a controversial live stream on Instagram in which Wahib requested a 12 year old boy to show his penis in front of his audience in exchange for 17,000 euros, a request the boy acted upon. It was intended as a pun, based on the fact that in Dutch the same phrase can mean "if you can show your penis" as well as "if you can make your penis see". This resulted in Wahib being dropped from BNNVARA and his record label TopNotch.

Filmography

Films 
2013: Mimoun, as friend of Ab
2014: De verloren zoon, as young delinquent
2015: Geen koningen in ons bloed, as Rafael
2016: Fissa, as Yous
2016: Layla M., as Younes, Layla's brother
2016: De Held, as Tarik
2017: Monk, as Younes
2017: 7 Marokkanen en Jos], as Yessin
2017: Broeders (English title Brothers), as Yasin
2017: Malik, as Amir
2018: Taal is zeg maar echt mijn ding, as an up-and-coming football talent
2019: De libi, (English title About That Life as Bilal
2020: Paradise Drifters, as Yousef
2021: Meskina

Television series 
2013: De vloer op jr., in diverse personalities
2014: Brugklas (English title The First Years, as Ravi
2014: A'dam - E.V.A., as Samih
2014: Verborgen verhalen, as Nas
2015: Vechtershart, as pizza delivery boy
2016: Toon, as Karim
2016: Nieuwe buren, as Aziz
2016: SpangaS, as Kaleb
2018: Flikken Maastricht, als Ahmed
2018-2021: Mocro Maffia, as Mo de Show
2019: Remy en Juliyat (a modern adaptation of Romeo and Juliet), as Hamza
2020: Commando's, as Aza Ouazani
2021: Red Light, as Elarbi

Discography

Albums

Singles

Songs featured in

Other charted songs

References

External links

Male actors from Amsterdam
Dutch male singers
Dutch rappers
1999 births
Living people
Musicians from Amsterdam
Dutch people of Moroccan descent